is a passenger railway station located in the town of Masaki, Ehime Prefecture, Japan. It is operated by the private transportation company Iyotetsu.

Lines

Layout
The station consists of two opposing side platforms and three tracks. One of the tracks was used as a siding when freight trains were in operation (no longer in use). The station is unattended.  During most of the day, trains arrive every fifteen minutes.

History
The station was opened on July 4, 1896.

Surrounding area
 Masaki Town Hall
 Ehime Prefectural Iyo High School
 Masaki Junior High School

See also
 List of railway stations in Japan

References

External links

Iyotetsu Gunchū Line
Railway stations in Ehime Prefecture
Railway stations in Japan opened in 1896
Masaki, Ehime